Axillary means "related to the axilla (armpit)" or "related to the leaf axils".

"Axillary" may refer to:

Biology
 Axillary artery
 Axillary border
 Axillary fascia
 Axillary feathers
 Axillary hairs
 Axillary lines
 Axillary lymph nodes
 Axillary nerve
 Axillary process
 Axillary sheath
 Axillary space
 Axillary tail
 Axillary vein
 Axillary (botany), of a flower or other structure found in a leaf axil

See also
 Auxiliary (disambiguation)
 Maxillary (disambiguation)